Julius "Jules" P. Alfonse (October 12, 1911 – May 21, 2000) was an American football fullback/halfback in the National Football League. He was a 2nd round selection (20th overall pick) by the Cleveland Rams out of Minnesota in the 1937 NFL Draft.

He died in 2000.

References

External links

1911 births
2000 deaths
People from Cumberland, Wisconsin
Players of American football from Wisconsin
American football fullbacks
American football halfbacks
Minnesota Golden Gophers football players
Cleveland Rams players